The 1979 Avon Championships of Chicago  was a women's tennis tournament played on indoor carpet courts at the International Amphitheatre  in Chicago, Illinois in the United States that was part of the 1979 Avon Championships Circuit. It was the eighth edition of the tournament and was held from January 29 through February 4, 1979. First-seeded Martina Navratilova won the singles title and earned $40,000 first-prize money.

Finals

Singles
 Martina Navratilova defeated  Tracy Austin 6–3, 6–4
 It was Navratilova's 3rd singles title of the year and the 27th of her career.

Doubles
 Rosie Casals /  Betty-Ann Stuart defeated  Ilana Kloss /  Greer Stevens 3–6, 7–5, 7–5

Prize money

References

External links
 International Tennis Federation (ITF) tournament edition details
 Tournament draws

Avon Championships of Chicago
Avon Championships of Chicago
1979 in Illinois